Lafayette Washington (January 26, 1915 – April 11, 1975) was an American Negro league pitcher in the 1940s.

A native of Alma, Arkansas, Washington made his Negro leagues debut in 1940 with the St. Louis–New Orleans Stars. He went on to play for the Birmingham Black Barons and Cincinnati Clowns, and finished his career in 1946 with the Seattle Steelheads. Washington died in Chicago, Illinois in 1975 at age 60.

References

External links
 and Seamheads

1915 births
1975 deaths
People from Alma, Arkansas
Baseball players from Arkansas
Birmingham Black Barons players
Cincinnati Clowns players
St. Louis–New Orleans Stars players
Seattle Steelheads players
20th-century African-American sportspeople